Thomas Pfannkuch (born 21 February 1970) is a German football manager and former player. As a player, he spent one season each in the Bundesliga with Borussia Mönchengladbach and the French Ligue 1 with Olympique Lyonnais.

In 2014, Pfannkuch was named manager of the German cerebral palsy international football team.

References

External links
 
 

1970 births
Living people
Sportspeople from Kassel
Footballers from Hesse
German footballers
Association football defenders
Bundesliga players
2. Bundesliga players
Ligue 1 players
Borussia Mönchengladbach players
SSV Reutlingen 05 players
Olympique Lyonnais players
Eintracht Braunschweig players
VfB Germania Halberstadt players
German football managers
Eintracht Braunschweig non-playing staff
German expatriate footballers
German expatriate sportspeople in France
Expatriate footballers in France